Inessa is a genus of skippers in the family Hesperiidae.

Footnotes

References
Natural History Museum Lepidoptera genus database

Hesperiidae genera
Hesperiidae